Chaiya Sukchinda (born 15 April 1935), worked as a taxi driver in Bangkok, is a retired Thai weightlifter who placed seventh in the flyweight class at the 1972 Olympics. Previously, he won the gold medal in 1966 Asian Games edition in Bangkok, Thailand, which earning him a new taxi car as incentive.

References

Weightlifters at the 1964 Summer Olympics
Weightlifters at the 1968 Summer Olympics
Weightlifters at the 1972 Summer Olympics
Chaiya Sukchinda
Living people
1935 births
Asian Games medalists in weightlifting
Chaiya Sukchinda
Weightlifters at the 1966 Asian Games
Medalists at the 1966 Asian Games
Chaiya Sukchinda
Chaiya Sukchinda
Chaiya Sukchinda